David Tidhar (7 June 1897 – 15 December 1970) was a Jewish-Israeli police officer, private detective and author.

Biography

Tidhar was born in Jaffa, and served in the Jewish legion and postware in Palestine Police Force in Jerusalem. In 1926 he left the force and established his own private investigation office in Tel Aviv. This attracted the notice of author Shlomo Ben-Yisrael, who founded The Detective Library in 1930, a series of chapbooks which featured the adventures of David Tidhar: The First Hebrew Detective. These were perhaps the first example of genuine mystery fiction published in Israel (then Mandatory Palestine) and brought Tidhar (whose picture adorned the covers) much publicity. The series ran 1930-1932 and some 28 volumes. Tidhar later withdrew his name, following which the series continued with the adventures of a new, fictional Hebrew Detective.

Rights to the series were later purchased by Haynt and published in Yiddish in the years before World War II.

Tidhar went on to edit the monumental 19-volume Encyclopedia of the Founders and Builders of Israel; a non-fiction study of crime in Palestine; and an autobiography. He is, however, best remembered for the Detective Library, individual volumes of which have since become collectors' items.

In modern fiction 

 The figure of David Tidhar appears several times in the works of author Lavie Tidhar (no relation), notably in the stories "The Projected Girl" (in Naked City, ed. Ellen Datlow, 2011) and "The Time Slip Detective" (in Tel Aviv Noir, ed. Etgar Keret and Assaf Gavron, 2014).

References

Israeli police officers
Private detectives and investigators
Israeli writers
Jewish encyclopedists
Burials at Kiryat Shaul Cemetery
People from Jaffa
1897 births
1970 deaths

Israeli male writers
Israeli editors